Tsukanov is a Russian masculine surname, its feminine counterpart is Tsukanova. It may refer to
Andrei Tsukanov (born 1977), Russian football player
Andriy Tsukanov, Ukrainian Paralympic football player
Ludmila Tsukanova (born 1982), Ukrainian football goalkeeper
Mariya Tsukanova (1924–1945), Hero of the Soviet Union
Nikolay Tsukanov (born 1965), Russian politician, psychologist and businessman
Sergei Tsukanov (born 1986), Russian football player

Russian-language surnames